Say Hello to Tragedy is the seventh studio album by Caliban. The album was released on 25 August 2009 (US), with Century Media Records.

"24 Years", the lead single from Say Hello to Tragedy was released on 17 July on the band's Myspace. A second song, "Caliban's Revenge" was released on their Myspace page on 24 July. A full album stream was put up on 13 August. A video was also made for "24 Years" and "Caliban's Revenge".

The album entered the German Media Control chart at No. 36.

The concept of Say Hello to Tragedy comes from questioning why tragedies happen nowadays that could have been prevented.

Guitarist Marc Goertz commented, "If people would just open their eyes and at least care a bit about their neighbours, relatives and the world in general, a lot of this adversity could be avoided. Some of our new songs are entirely fictional, whereas other ones refer to real life dramas like the Fritzl case."

Track listing 

All music written by Marc Görtz.
All lyrics written by Andreas Dörner except where noted.

 Track 8 is mistakenly written as "The Degenation Of Humanity".

Credits 

 Caliban

 Andreas Dörner – Lead vocals 
 Marc Görtz – Lead Guitar 
 Denis Schmidt - Rhythm Guitar; Clean Vocals 
 Marco Schaller Bass; Backing Vocals 
 Patrick Grun - Drums 

 Guest musicians

 Vocals – Dennis Diehl (The Mercury Arc) on "Liar"
 Vocals – Florian Velten (ex-Machinemade God) on "Love Song"
 Guitar – Sky Hoff guitar solo on "The Degenation of Humanity"

Additional

 Co-Production – Marc Görtz
 Recording – Benny Richter; Sky Hoff; Toni Meloni
 Mixing – Adam D.
 Mastering – Vince
 Artwork – Bastian Sobtzick (Callejon)

Charts

References 

2009 albums
Caliban (band) albums
Century Media Records albums